Leptophobia philoma, the philoma white, is a butterfly in the family Pieridae. It is found in Peru, Ecuador and Bolivia.

Subspecies
The following subspecies are recognised:
Leptophobia philoma philoma (Ecuador)
Leptophobia philoma subargentea Butler, 1898 (Peru, Bolivia)
Leptophobia philoma pastaza (Joicey & Talbot, 1928) (Ecuador)

References

Pierini
Butterflies described in 1870
Pieridae of South America
Taxa named by William Chapman Hewitson